Hayden Ranch Headquarters is located near Leadville, Colorado and is an example of early high country agricultural operations. Colorado Mountain College currently owns the property.

A  portion of the original ranch was listed on the National Register of Historic Places in 2003.  The listing included 16 contributing buildings and a contributing site.

It is located about ten miles south of Leadville and eighteen miles north of Granite, Colorado on U.S. Highway 24, which is also known as the Top of the Rockies State and National Historic and Scenic Byway. It is close to the Derry Mining Site Camp, which is also National Register-listed.

See also
National Register of Historic Places listings in Lake County, Colorado

References

External links
 

Ranches on the National Register of Historic Places in Colorado
Buildings and structures in Lake County, Colorado
National Register of Historic Places in Lake County, Colorado